Irwin Glacier is a steep tributary glacier in the Bowers Mountains of Antarctica, draining northeast from Edlin Névé and at the terminus coalescing with Montigny Glacier (from the north), with which it enters the larger Graveson Glacier. The glacier was mapped by the United States Geological Survey from surveys and U.S. Navy air photos, 1960–64, and was named by the Advisory Committee on Antarctic Names for Carlisle S. Irwin, a former glaciologist who participated in the study of Meserve Glacier in 1966–67. The glacier lies situated on the Pennell Coast, a portion of Antarctica lying between Cape Williams and Cape Adare.

See also
 List of glaciers in the Antarctic
 Glaciology

References

Glaciers of Pennell Coast